Kochu Kochu Thettukal is a 1980 Indian Malayalam film,  directed by Mohan. The film stars Sukumaran, Hema Choudhary, Innocent, Beena and Shubha in the lead roles. The film has musical score by Shyam.

Cast

Sukumaran
Hema Chaudhary
Shubha
Sathyakala
K. P. Ummer
Sukumari
Innocent
Paravoor Bharathan
Santhakumari
Kalasala Babu

Soundtrack
The music was composed by Shyam and the lyrics were written by Bichu Thirumala.

References

External links

1980 films
1980s Malayalam-language films